Team Arcana is a Japanese video game developer and a successor of Examu, which mostly produce fighting games for arcades and home consoles. It is known for developing the Arcana Heart series, the company's namesake, as well as Daemon Bride series. Team Arcana's existence as a re-branded successor of Examu had been dated back to Arcana Heart series' crossover inclusion in BlazBlue: Cross Tag Battle.

At the end of February 2020, its predecessor, Examu suspended its business operations. Any ongoing development works and product supports (most particularly ongoing supported fighting games (including licensed fighting games)) have migrated to Team Arcana.

Games

References

External links
Official website 

Video game companies established in 2019
Japanese companies established in 2019
Video game companies of Japan
Video game development companies